The men's team competition in the Swedish system was an artistic gymnastics event held as part of the Gymnastics at the 1912 Summer Olympics programme. It was the first appearance of the event, which would only be held again at the 1920 Summer Olympics. It was one of three team gymnastics events.  The others were a team competition in the free system and a standard team competition.

Medalists

Results

Scores are an average of five judges' marks.

References

Sources
 
 

Gymnastics at the 1912 Summer Olympics